LC Aris FC is an American soccer team based in La Crosse, Wisconsin, United States. Founded in 2008, the team plays in the National Premier Soccer League (NPSL), a regional amateur league at the fourth tier of the American Soccer Pyramid.

The team play its home matches at Logan High School in La Crosse, Wisconsin. The team's colors are yellow, black and white.

History
Aris FC joined the National Premier Soccer League as an expansion team in 2009, having been formed by Greek American businessman Greg Saliaras, the owner of a successful soccer store in Eau Claire, Wisconsin, and who named the team after his favorite club, Aris Thessaloniki. The team is affiliated with the EC Aris soccer team, which has been competing in youth soccer leagues in the Eau Claire area for many years.

The Aris played their first competitive game on May 31, 2009, a 5–0 loss to Wisconsin rivals Madison 56ers, which set the manner in which their first competitive season would continue; they did not achieve an on-field victory at all year, picking up their only points when their opponents in their final regular season game, FC Indiana, forfeited the game. They finished second from bottom in the Midwest Division, only avoiding last spot as a result of Indiana's points deduction.

After five seasons in Eau Claire, the club relocated to La Crosse. LC Aris FC sat out the 2015 season, but returned to the NPSL Midwest in 2016.

Year-by-year

Head coaches
  Antonios Lepitsas (2016–present)
 Ezequiel Magallon (2012)
  Greg Saliaras (2009–2011; 2013–2014)

Stadia
 Bollinger Field; Eau Claire, Wisconsin (2009–2013)
 Dorais Field; Chippewa Falls, Wisconsin (2009)
 Viterbo Athletic Complex; La Crosse, Wisconsin (2013, 2014)
Logan High School Stadium, La Crosse Wisconsin

References

External links
 Official website

National Premier Soccer League teams
Soccer clubs in Wisconsin
Sports in Eau Claire, Wisconsin
2009 establishments in Wisconsin